Phalombe is a town in Malawi. It is the district capital of Phalombe District.

Location
The geographical location of Phalombe are 15°48'12.0"S, 35°39'12.0"E (Latitude:-15.803333; Longitude:35.653333).

Overview
It is situated below the Fort Lister Gap between the two larger parts of the Mulanje Massif. Due to this location it is vulnerable for flash floods, which can easily occur during the rainy season. The most devastating one in recent history occurred in March 1991, which left Phalombe with a 2-3 meter (7 to 10 feet) high mud layer and killed hundreds of people. On this spot a monument was erected to remember the named and unnamed victims.

Points of interest
, south of the town center, along the Phalombe-Mulanje Road, is a Catholic mission consisting of a Catholic church and the Holy Family Hospital. The hospital is run by locals in association with the Dutch charity Memisa and is staffed by Malawian clinical officers as well as Dutch tropical doctors. Holy Family Nursing College is attached to the hospital.
 
The road from Mulanje to Phalombe is tarmacked, as of May 2019.

Demographics

Weather
Generally, the weather in Phalombe is warm, muggy and cloudy, from November to April and is comfortable, clear and cool from May through October. During the course of the year, the temperature typically varies from 59 °F to 86 °F (15 °C to 30 °C) and is rarely below 56 °F (13 °C) or above 92 °F (33 °C).

References

Southern Region, Malawi
Populated places in Southern Region, Malawi